George Elmer Outland (October 8, 1906 – March 2, 1981) was an American educator, photographer, and politician who served two terms as a Democratic United States Congressman from California from 1943 to 1947.



Biography
George Elmer Outland was born in Santa Paula, Ventura County, California, on October 8, 1906.  He attended public schools and Whittier College in California, where he received an A.B., in 1928.  He received his M.A. from Harvard University in 1929, and his Ph.D. from Yale University in 1937.  He also attended the University of Southern California in Los Angeles.

Outland served as assistant director of boy's work, Hale House, Boston, Massachusetts, from 1928–1930, director of boy's work, Denison House, Boston, Mass., from 1929–1933, Neighborhood House, Los Angeles, California., from 1933 and 1934; supervisor of boys' welfare for Federal Transient Service of Southern California in 1934 and 1935; and director of New Haven Community College in 1935 and 1936. Outland was also a prolific amateur photographer and one of his favorite subjects was baseball. In 2009, McFarland & Company collected several of his photos into Baseball Visions of the Roaring Twenties: a Fan's Photographs of over 400 Players and  Ballparks of the Era with text by Outland's son John.

He was an instructor at Yale University 1935-1937, and served on the faculty of Santa Barbara State College, from 1937-1942.

Outland was a delegate to the California State Democratic Conventions from 1942–1950, and was elected as a Democrat to the Seventy-eighth and Seventy-ninth Congresses (January 3, 1943–January 3, 1947).  He was an unsuccessful candidate for reelection in 1946 to the Eightieth Congress.  Outland was later a delegate to the Democratic National Conventions, 1944 and 1948; was chairman of the Democratic State policy committee from 1948 to 1950.

Later in life, he was a professor at San Francisco State College from 1947–1972.  Outland resided in Anacortes, Washington, where he died March 2, 1981.  Outland was cremated and his ashes are interred at Pierce Cemetery, Santa Paula, California.

See also
U.S. Congressional Delegations from California

Notes

References

External links
 Bioguide (U.S. Congress)

Outland, George E.
1906 births
1981 deaths
Burials in Ventura County, California
People from Santa Paula, California
Harvard University alumni
University of Southern California alumni
Whittier College alumni
Yale University alumni
20th-century American politicians
Democratic Party members of the United States House of Representatives from California